Paul Bahoken (7 July 1955) is a Cameroonian former professional footballer. He competed for the Cameroon national team at the 1982 FIFA World Cup as a forward. At club level he played in France for Troyes AC, AS Cannes, Valenciennes, Olympique Alès, and Stade Raphaëlois.

Personal life
Bahoken's son, Stéphane Bahoken, is also a professional footballer and international for the Cameroon national team.

References

External links
 
 

Living people
1955 births
Cameroonian footballers
Footballers from Douala
Association football forwards
Cameroon international footballers
Olympic footballers of Cameroon
Footballers at the 1984 Summer Olympics
1982 FIFA World Cup players
Tonnerre Yaoundé players
ES Troyes AC players
AS Cannes players
Valenciennes FC players
Olympique Alès players
ÉFC Fréjus Saint-Raphaël players
Cameroonian expatriate footballers
Cameroonian expatriate sportspeople in France
Expatriate footballers in France